Benjamin Toews is an American politician serving as a member of the Idaho Senate for the 4th district. He assumed office on December 1, 2022.

Education 
Toews earned an associate degree from North Idaho College and a Bachelor of Business Administration from Gonzaga University.

Career 
For 17 years, Toews worked for Bullet Tools, a tool manufacturing company he helped launch and co-owned with his in-laws. The company was acquired by the Marshalltown Company in 2019. Toews was elected to the Idaho Senate in November 2022.

References 

Living people
Republican Party Idaho state senators
People from Coeur d'Alene, Idaho
Gonzaga University alumni
Year of birth missing (living people)